This is a list of awards and nominations received by Alexandre Desplat, the French film composer.

It includes two Academy Awards, three BAFTA Awards and two Golden Globe Awards.

Major Associations

Academy Awards
The Academy Awards are a set of awards given annually for excellence of cinematic achievements. The awards, organized by the Academy of Motion Picture Arts and Sciences, were first held in 1929 at the Hollywood Roosevelt Hotel. Desplat has received two awards from eleven nominations.

{| class="wikitable
|-
! scope="col" style="width:1em;"| Year
! scope="col" style="width:35em;"| Nominated work
! scope="col" style="width:40em;"| Category
! scope="col" style="width:5em;"| Result
! scope="col" style="width:1em;"| Ref
|-
| 2007
| The Queen
| rowspan=11 | Best Original Score
| 
| rowspan=11 | 
|-
| 2009
| The Curious Case of Benjamin Button
| 
|-
| 2010
| Fantastic Mr. Fox
| 
|-
| 2011
| The King's Speech
| 
|-
| 2013
| Argo
| 
|-
| 2014
| Philomena
| 
|-
| rowspan=2 |2015
| The Grand Budapest Hotel
| 
|-
| The Imitation Game
| 
|-
|2018
| The Shape of Water
| 
|-
|2019
| Isle of Dogs
| 
|-
|2020
| Little Women
| 
|-style="border-top:2px solid gray;"

BAFTA Awards
The BAFTA Award is an annual award show presented by the British Academy of Film and Television Arts. The awards were founded in 1947 as The British Film Academy, by David Lean, Alexander Korda, Carol Reed, Charles Laughton, Roger Manvell and others. Desplat has received three awards from eleven nominations.

{| class="wikitable
|-
! scope="col" style="width:1em;"| Year
! scope="col" style="width:35em;"| Nominated work
! scope="col" style="width:40em;"| Category
! scope="col" style="width:5em;"| Result
! scope="col" style="width:1em;"| Ref
|-
| 2003
| Girl with a Pearl Earring
| rowspan=12 | Best Film Music
| 
|-
| 2006
| The Queen
| 
|-
| 2009
| The Curious Case of Benjamin Button
| 
|-
| 2010
| Fantastic Mr. Fox
| 
|-
| 2011
| The King's Speech
| 
|-
| 2013
| Argo
| 
|-
| 2015
| The Grand Budapest Hotel
| 
|-
| 2018
| The Shape of Water
| 
|-
| 2019
| Isle of Dogs
| 
|-
| 2020
| Little Women
| 
|-
| 2022
| The French Dispatch
| 
|-
| 2023
| Guillermo del Toro's Pinocchio
| 
|-

César Awards
The César Awards are France's national film awards. With three awards out of ten nominations, Desplat is both the most nominated and most rewarded composer.

{| class="wikitable
|-
! scope="col" style="width:1em;"| Year
! scope="col" style="width:35em;"| Nominated work
! scope="col" style="width:40em;"| Category
! scope="col" style="width:5em;"| Result
! scope="col" style="width:1em;"| Ref
|-
| 1997
| Un héros très discret
| rowspan=10 |Best Music Written for a Film
| 
|-
| 2002
| Sur mes lèvres
| 
|-
| 2006
| The Beat That My Heart Skipped
| 
|-
| 2008
| L'Ennemi intime
| 
|-
| 2010
| A Prophet
| 
|-
| 2011
| The Ghost Writer
| 
|-
| 2013
| Rust and Bone
| 
|-
| 2014
| Venus in Fur
| 
|-
| 2019
| The Sisters Brothers
| 
|-
| 2020
| An Officer and a Spy
| 
|-

Golden Globe Awards
The Golden Globe Award is an accolade bestowed by the 93 members of the Hollywood Foreign Press Association (HFPA) recognizing excellence in film and television, both domestic and foreign. Desplat has received two awards from twelve nominations.

{| class="wikitable
|-
! scope="col" style="width:1em;"| Year
! scope="col" style="width:35em;"| Nominated work
! scope="col" style="width:40em;"| Category
! scope="col" style="width:5em;"| Result
! scope="col" style="width:1em;"| Ref
|-
| 2004
| Girl with a Pearl Earring
| rowspan="14"| Best Original Score – Motion Picture
| 
|-
| 2006
| Syriana
| 
|-
| 2007
| The Painted Veil
| 
|-
| 2009
| The Curious Case of Benjamin Button
| 
|-
| 2011
| The King's Speech
| 
|-
| 2013
| Argo
| 
|-
| 2015
| The Imitation Game
| 
|-
| 2016
| The Danish Girl
| 
|-
| 2018
| The Shape of Water
| 
|-
| 2019
| Isle of Dogs
| 
|-
| 2020
| Little Women
| 
|-
| 2021
| The Midnight Sky
| 
|-
| 2022
| The French Dispatch
| 
|-
| rowspan="2"| 2023 
| rowspan="2"| Guillermo del Toro's Pinocchio
| 
|-
| Best Original Song
|

Grammy Awards
The Grammy Awards are presented by The Recording Academy to recognize achievements in the music industry. Desplat has received ten nominations and won two awards.

{| class="wikitable
|-
! scope="col" style="width:1em;"| Year
! scope="col" style="width:35em;"| Nominated work
! scope="col" style="width:40em;"| Category
! scope="col" style="width:5em;"| Result
! scope="col" style="width:1em;"| Ref
|-
| 2009
| The Curious Case of Benjamin Button
| rowspan="8"|Best Score Soundtrack for Visual Media
| 
|-
| 2011
| The King's Speech
| 
|-
| 2012
| Harry Potter and the Deathly Hallows – Part 2
| 
|-
| rowspan="2"|2013
| Argo
| 
|-
| Zero Dark Thirty
| 
|-
| |2015
| The Grand Budapest Hotel
| 
|-
|2016
| The Imitation Game
| 
|-
| rowspan="3"|2019
| rowspan="1"|The Shape of Water
| 
|-
| rowspan="2"|"The Shape of Water"
| Best Arrangement, Instrumental or A Capella
| 
|-
| rowspan="2"|Best Instrumental Composition
| 
|-
| 2021
| "Plumfield"
|

Other Awards

Annie Awards

|-
| 40th Annie Awards
| Rise of the Guardians
| Outstanding Achievement for Music in an Animated Feature Production
| 
|-
| 44th Annie Awards
| The Secret Life of Pets
| Best Music in an Animated Feature Production
| 
|-
| 44th Annie Awards
| Trollhunters
| Best Music in an Animated TV/Broadcast Production
| 
|-
| 50th Annie Awards
| Pinocchio
| Best Music in an Animated Feature Production
| 
|-

Lumières Awards

|-
| 2019
| The Sisters Brothers
| Best Music
| 
|-
| 2020
| Adults in the Room
| Best Music
| 
|-

Satellite Awards 

|-
| 2010
| Harry Potter and the Deathly Hallows – Part 1
| rowspan=10|Best Score
| 
|-
| 2011
| Harry Potter and the Deathly Hallows – Part 2
| 
|-
| 2012
| Argo
| 
|-
| 2013
| Philomena
| 
|-
| 2014
| The Imitation Game
| 
|-
| 2015
| The Danish Girl
| 
|-
| 2017
| The Shape of Water
| 
|-
| 2018
| The Sisters Brothers
| 
|-
| 2020
| The Midnight Sky
| 
|-
| 2021
| The French Dispatch
|

Critics and Music Groups

Won
 2005 Silver Berlin Bear for Best Film Music – The Beat That My Heart Skipped
 2006 Los Angeles Film Critics Association Award for Best Music – The Painted Veil and The Queen
 2007 BMI Film Music Award – The Queen
 2007 European Film Award for Best Composer – The Queen
 2007 Golden Horse Award for Best Original Film Score – Lust, Caution
 2007 World Soundtrack Award for Film Composer of the Year – The Queen and The Painted Veil
 2008 Phoenix Film Critics Society Award for Best Original Score – The Curious Case of Benjamin Button
 2009 BMI Film Music Award – The Curious Case of Benjamin Button
 2009 World Soundtrack Award for Best Original Score of the Year – The Curious Case of Benjamin Button
 2009 World Soundtrack Award for Film Composer of the Year – The Curious Case of Benjamin Button, Coco Before Chanel, Largo Winch and Chéri
 2010 Étoile d'Or for Best Music (Meilleure musique) – A Prophet, The Army of Crime, Afterwards, Coco Before Chanel and Chéri
 2010 World Soundtrack Award for Best Original Score of the Year – Fantastic Mr. Fox
 2010 World Soundtrack Award for Film Composer of the Year – Fantastic Mr. Fox, The Twilight Saga: New Moon, Julie & Julia, The Ghost Writer
 2010 IFMCA Award for Best Original Score for a Drama Film – The King's Speech
 2010 IFMCA Award for Film Composer of the Year
 2010 IFMCA Award for Best Original Score for an Action/Adventure/Thriller Film – The Ghost Writer
 2011 Sammy Film Music Award for Best New Film Score – The King's Speech
 2011 César Award for Best Music Written for a Film (Meilleure musique écrite pour un film) – The Ghost Writer
 2011 World Soundtrack Award for Film Composer of the Year – A Better Life, The Burma Conspiracy, The King's Speech, The Tree of Life, The Well Digger's Daughter, Harry Potter and the Deathly Hallows – Part 1, and Harry Potter and the Deathly Hallows – Part 2
 2011 Étoile d'Or for Film Music Composer – The Ghost Writer
 2011 San Diego Film Critics Society Award for Best Score – Harry Potter and the Deathly Hallows – Part 2
 2014 World Soundtrack Award for Best Original Score of the Year – The Grand Budapest Hotel
 2014 World Soundtrack Award for Film Composer of the Year – Godzilla, The Grand Budapest Hotel, Marius, The Monuments Men, Philomena, Venus in Fur, and Zulu
 2014 Sammy Film Music Award for Best New Film Score – The Grand Budapest Hotel
 2016 Hollywood Music in Media Awards for  Best Original Score – Animated Film - The Secret Life of Pets

Nominations 
 2004 European Film Award for Best Composer – Girl with a Pearl Earring
 2005 Online Film Critics Society Award for Best Original Score – Birth
 2006 Étoile d'Or for Best Music (Meilleure musique) – The Beat That My Heart Skipped
 2006 Chicago Film Critics Association Award for Best Original Score – The Queen
 2007 Chicago Film Critics Association Award for Best Original Score – Lust, Caution
 2008 Étoile d'Or for Best Music (Meilleure musique) – L'ennemi intime
 2008 Chicago Film Critics Association Award for Best Original Score – The Curious Case of Benjamin Button
 2008 Broadcast Film Critics Association Award for Best Composer – Lust, Caution
 2008 Asian Film Awards for Best Composer – Lust, Caution
 2008 World Soundtrack Award for Film Composer of the Year – The Golden Compass
 2009 Online Film Critics Society Award for Best Original Score – The Curious Case of Benjamin Button
 2009 European Film Award for Best Composer – Coco Before Chanel
 2009 Chicago Film Critics Association Award for Best Original Score – Fantastic Mr. Fox
 2009 Central Ohio Film Critics Association Award for Best Score – The Curious Case of Benjamin Button
 2009 Broadcast Film Critics Association Award for Best Composer – The Curious Case of Benjamin Button
 2009 Saturn Award for Best Music – The Curious Case of Benjamin Button
 2010 Online Film Critics Society Award for Best Original Score – Fantastic Mr. Fox
 2010 IFMCA Award for Film Score of the Year – The King's Speech, The Ghost Writer
 2010 IFMCA Award for Best Original Score for a Fantasy/Science Fiction/Horror Film – Harry Potter and the Deathly Hallows – Part 1
 2010 IFMCA Award for Film Music Composition of the Year – Truth About Ruth from The Ghost Writer
 2011 Hollywood Music in Media Award for Original Score-Feature Film – The Ides of March
 2011 World Soundtrack Award for Best Original Film Score of the Year – The King's Speech
 2011 Phoenix Film Critics Society Award for Best Original Score – Extremely Loud & Incredibly Close
 2011 San Diego Film Critics Society Award for Best Score – The Tree of Life
 2011 San Diego Film Critics Society Award for Best Score – Extremely Loud & Incredibly Close
 2011 IFMCA Award for Film Composer of the Year
 2011 IFMCA Award for Best Original Score for a Fantasy/Science Fiction/Horror Film – Harry Potter and the Deathly Hallows – Part 2
 2012 World Soundtrack Award for Best Original Film Score of the Year – The Ides of March
 2012 World Soundtrack Award for Film Composer of the Year
 2012 18th Critics' Choice Awards for Best Score – Argo, Moonrise Kingdom
 2013 World Soundtrack Award for Film Composer of the Year
 2013 58th David di Donatello Award for Best Music (Migliore Musicista) – Reality
 2015 Saturn Award for Best Music - Godzilla
 2017 Annie Award for Best Music - The Secret Life of Pets
 2017 International Film Music Critics Association for Best Original Score for a Comedy Film - The Secret Life of Pets
 2018 Saturn Award for Best Music - The Shape of Water

References 

Desplat, Alexandre